Bleikvatnet is a lake in the municipality of Hemnes in Nordland county, Norway. The  lake is regulated by a dam.

See also
 List of lakes in Norway
 Geography of Norway

References

Hemnes
Lakes of Nordland
Reservoirs in Norway